Jerald Dustin DeVore (born November 26, 1973 in Peoria, Illinois, United States), known by his shortened name Jerry DeVore, is an American, an educator, and a freelance bassist working in New York City.  His career began in Illinois, performing with symphony orchestras, commercial music, musical theater, jazz ensembles, and various recording sessions.  Upon leaving Illinois in 1997, DeVore toured the nation with the Air Force Band, until 2001.  During this period, he continued recording and performing with small and large jazz groups in the Omaha, Nebraska area, while his main duties were with the AF Concert Band and Jazz Band.  Before leaving the AF, DeVore continued studying classical music and joined and R&B band called the Confidentials.  He would continue performing with this group and local jazz musicians, until his departure to New York City in 2008.

2008 saw the beginning of his master's degree in jazz performance from New York University, where he graduated in 2010 and was awarded the Josephson Award for Outstanding Jazz Studies.  At NYU, DeVore studied with an impressive list of faculty members and his career in jazz moved forward.  DeVore continues to be active in the New York City music scene, within several diverse circles.

Education

Studies
New York University, NY (2010)
Master's degree in jazz performance
Music technology
Winner of the Barney Josephson Award for Outstanding Jazz Studies
Graduated with honors

Electric Lounge Studios, Illinois (2005)
Digital recording training
Courses completed – Pro Tools 101, 201, and 210M

University of Nebraska at Omaha, Nebraska (2005)
Pedagogy of music theory, graduate-level course

Bradley University, Illinois (graduated December 1996)
Bachelor of Music degree - graduated cum laude 
Music performance pajor - emphasis on bass studies

Private instructors

Classical bass
 Steven Lestor
 Earl Gately
 Dr. Mark Morton
 James Lambert
 Joseph Guastafeste

Jazz
 Kenny Werner
 Jean-Michel Pilc
 Johannes Weidenmuller
 Mike Richmond
 Billy Drummond

Recording

2012–2008

2007–2002

2001-1998

Performance

Broadway Musicals

Outside Broadway musicals

External links
 Jerry DeVore
 Christmas from the Blue Note

1973 births
Living people
Musicians from Peoria, Illinois
American double-bassists
Male double-bassists
Musicians from New York City
American music educators
Educators from New York City
Educators from Illinois
21st-century double-bassists
21st-century American male musicians